Mathilde Warnier (born ) is a French actress, model, and columnist.

In 2011, she became known for an exchange with Nicolas Bedos on the set of the show Au Field de la nuit.

In 2021, she portrayed Nadine Gires in The Serpent, a British TV drama which tells the story of the serial killer Charles Sobhraj.

Biography 

On 21 October 2011, Warnier became a student in audiovisual BTS and took part in the series Au Field de la nuit, whereupon she took to the floor to comment on the book that Nicolas Bedos promotes. The scathing exchange that followed was noticed during the broadcast on,

In 2013, Warnier became one of the muses of Cacharel for the feminine perfume 'Anaïs Anaïs'. She was on the cover of the magazine Paulette  in 2014, and in September 2015, she posed for the lingerie brand Miss Crofton. She made several commercials for Évian and Carte Noire, and appeared in two short films and a prevention spot for AIDES, before joining the cast of the television series Au service de la France (screened in English as A Very Secret Service).

On 5 September 2016, Warnier became a reporter for the  Le Petit Journal presented by Cyrille Eldin on Canal +, but left three weeks later. At the same time, she announced that she had given up television.

Filmography

Film

Television

References

External links
 

Living people
21st-century French actresses
Actresses from Paris
French film actresses
Year of birth missing (living people)